Jaquirana is a municipality in the state of Rio Grande do Sul, Brazil.  As of 2020, the estimated population was 3,662.

The municipality contains part of the  Tainhas State Park, created in 1975.

See also
List of municipalities in Rio Grande do Sul

References

Municipalities in Rio Grande do Sul